Correction may refer to:

 A euphemism for punishment
 A euphemism for brainwashing
 Correction (newspaper), the posting of a notice of a mistake in a past issue of a newspaper
 Correction (stock market), in financial markets, a short-term price decline
 Correction (novel), a 1975 novel by Thomas Bernhard
 a perturbation to an equation in perturbation theory (quantum mechanics)
radiative correction
oblique correction
nonoblique correction
loop correction

See also 
 
 Corrections (disambiguation)
 Corrector, a political/administrative office in classical Antiquity and some religions